Patrik Čarnota (born 10 October 1986) is a Slovak footballer who plays as a defender or a defensive midfielder.

His brother Ján Čarnota is also footballer.

Club career
He was signed by Trnava in July 2010 and made his debut for them against Senica on 17 July 2010.

He had a brief spell in Polish GKS Tychy in fall 2013, but returned to Trnava in February 2014.

References

External links

1986 births
Living people
People from Stará Ľubovňa
Sportspeople from the Prešov Region
Slovak footballers
Association football midfielders
MFK Dolný Kubín players
FC Spartak Trnava players
Slovak Super Liga players
Expatriate footballers in Poland
Glinik Gorlice players